Slessor Peak is a mainly ice-covered peak, 2,370 m, standing at the southwest end of Bruce Plateau in Graham Land, close northwest of Gould Glacier. It rises about 300 m above the general level of the plateau ice sheet and has a steep rock face on its north side. First surveyed in 1946-47 by a Falkland Islands Dependencies Survey (FIDS) sledge party led by Robert S. Slessor, FIDS medical officer at Stonington Island, for whom the peak is named.

Mountains of Graham Land
Loubet Coast